Ilie Bratu (born October 14, 1948 in Slobozia Mare, Moldavian SSR) is a Moldovan politician.

Biography 
Between 1990 and 1994, he was a member of the Parliament of the Republic of Moldova, being one of the 278 deputies who signed the Declaration of Independence of the Republic of Moldova.

Distinctions and decorations
 Order of the Republic (2012)
 The "Civic Merit" Medal (1996)

References

External links 
 Despre noi
 ASOCIAŢIA OBŞTEASCĂ "PRO ROMÂNIA"
 http://assembly.coe.int/ASP/AssemblyList/AL_MemberDetails.asp?MemberID=6156
 Cine au fost şi ce fac deputaţii primului Parlament din R. Moldova (1990-1994)?
 Declaraţia deputaţilor din primul Parlament
 Site-ul Parlamentului Republicii Moldova

  

1948 births
Living people
People from Cahul District
Moldovan MPs 1990–1994
Popular Front of Moldova MPs